List of rivers flowing in the island of Bali, Indonesia.

In alphabetical order

See also
 List of bodies of water in Bali
 List of rivers of Indonesia
 List of rivers of Lesser Sunda Islands

References

 
Bali
Bali